Xewkija Tigers F.C. is a football club from the village of Xewkija in Gozo, Malta. The club was founded in 1938, and currently plays in the Gozo Football League First Division.

History
Xewkija Tigers can trace their foundation back to 1939. Yet it was five years after that, that they played their first competitive match. The Xewkija Tigers first participated in the local competitions during the 1944-45 season, as previously they had only played friendly games, mainly due to the difficulties Gozitans suffered during the World War II. Xewkija's first honour arrived in the following season, 1945–46, where they lifted the Galea Cup in a match won against Xaghra Blue by 1–0 on 12 May 1946.

In the period between 1958–59 and 1965–66 seasons Xewkija participated in the local league under two different names, Xewkija United/Xewkija Tigers and Xewkija Rovers. The name Xewkija United was only used for a single season (1958–59), where successively the team was called again Xewkija Tigers. Whereas Xewkija Rovers continued to play as a separate team from the Tigers for some more years in the Gozo Football League, precisely until the 1965–66 season. At the end of this season it was decided that Xewkija Rovers should stop participating in the Gozitan league, leaving the village's representation solely to Xewkija Tigers.

Xewkija Tigers' first domestic league honour came at the end of the 1974–75 season. This squad included the likes of John Busuttil, Mike Apap, Salvu Cilia, Charlie Le Prevost, Frank Mizzi, Carmel Attard, Raymond Rapa, Paul Vella, John Spiteri, Wistin Scerri, John Attard, Carmel Portelli, Benny Vella, Paul Hili, Joe Debrincat and Joe Grech. It was guided to victory under Mr. Joe Psaila, whereas the club was in the hands of President Mr. Frans Zammit Haber.

In the early 1980s (1982–83 and 1983–84) Xewkija Tigers managed to win two consecutive league titles, together with the GFA Cup and the Silver Jubilee Cup. The team managed to win all the titles which the Gozitan league offered in these years. Xewkija were managed by Mr. Salvu Cilia.

Xewkija Tigers' last domestic title arrived in the 2000–01 season in a decider final won against Nadur Youngsters F.C. by 4–3. Xewkija were once again managed by Mr. Salvu Cilia, who incidentally left his mark in all Xewkija's league titles (one as a player and three as a coach).

After two seasons in the lowest division of the Gozo Football League, Xewkija Tigers returned at the end of the 2008–09 season after winning the Promotion Decided with contenders Xaghra United by 3–2 (starting line-up: J.Grima, S.Mercieca, J.Vella, J.Vella, J.Cefai; S.Mizzi, A.Fotso, M.Pace (P.Rapa), J.Azzopardi (J.Azzopardi); C.Bugeja, R.Buttigieg). The coach at the time was Mario Bonello.

In 2011-2012 season Xewkija Tigers won the title in Gozo Football League First Division,GFA Cup,Independence Cup (Malta) 

In 22nd December 2022 Xewkija Tigers played against Sannat Lions Xewkija beat Sannat 7-0

Players

Current squad

Out On Loan

Honours

First Division:
Champions (8): 1974–75; 1982–83; 1983–84; 2000–01; 2011–12; 2013–14; 2014–15; 2016–2017
Runners-up (8): 1984–85; 1985–86; 1990–91; 1991–92; 2001–02; 2004–05 2012–2013 2015–2016 

Second Division:
Champions (7): 1964–65; 1969–70; 1972–73; 1980–81; 1987–88; 1995–96; 2008–09
Runners-up (5): 1952–53; 1968–69; 1979–80; 1993–94; 2007–08

G.F.A. Cup:
Champions (11): 1983–84; 1984–85; 1989–90; 1990–91; 1999–00; 2001–02; 2004–05; 2011–2012; 2014–2015; 2015–2016; 2017-2018;

Super Cup:
Champions (4): 2004–05; 2011–2012 2014–2015 2015–2016 2016-2017 2017-2018 

Republic Cup:
Champions (1): 1999–00

Gemaharija Cup:
Champions (1): 1989–90

Silver Jubilee Cup:
Champions (1): 1983–84

Independence Cup:
Champions (4): 1992–93; 2000–01; 2003–04; 2011–12

Freedom Cup:
Champions  (5): 1979–80; 1980–81; 2000–01; 2003–04; 2011–2012

Galea Cup:
Champions (2): 1945–46; 1952–53

Challenge Cup:
Champions (2): 1974–75; 1980–81

Rothmans Cup:
Champions (1): 1987–88 (2nd Div.)

K.O. Winners Cup:
Champions (2): 1993–94 (2nd Div.); 1996–97 (1st Div.) 016-2017 (1st Div)02

References

External links
 Xewkija Tigers Official Website

Football clubs in Malta
Gozitan football clubs
1939 establishments in Malta
Xewkija